Nonito Gonzales Donaire Jr.  (born November 16, 1982) is a Filipino American professional boxer. He has held multiple world championships in four weight classes from flyweight to featherweight, and is the oldest boxer in history to win a bantamweight world title, as well as being the first three-time champion in that weight class. Donaire has also held world championships in three consecutive decades: the 2000s, 2010s and 2020s, being the sixth boxer to do so after Evander Holyfield, Manny Pacquiao, Bernard Hopkins, Érik Morales, and Floyd Mayweather Jr.

In total, Donaire has held nine world titles by the main four boxing sanctioning bodies. He has also held the IBO flyweight title, the WBA interim super flyweight title, and the Ring magazine and lineal super bantamweight titles. As of June 2021, Donaire is ranked as the world's second best active bantamweight by The Ring, the Transnational Boxing Rankings Board, BoxRec, and ESPN.

Donaire is popularly known as "The Filipino Flash" due to his fast hand speed and punching power, and is a two-time winner of The Rings Knockout of the Year award, in 2007 and 2011. He reached a peak pound for pound ranking of third by The Ring in 2011, and was named Fighter of the Year in 2012 by the Boxing Writers Association of America. Donaire is one of a select few Asian boxers to win world titles in at least four weight classes, along with fellow Filipinos Manny Pacquiao and Donnie Nietes.

Early life 
Donaire was born in Talibon, Bohol, Philippines, the third of four children to Nonito C. Donaire, Sr. (born 1959, South Cotabato) and Imelda M. Gonzales (born 1950, Talibon). His older brother is former boxer Glenn Donaire, and his cousin is former boxer Richard Donaire.

Until he was six years of age, Donaire lived in General Santos and attended the same school as future eight-division world champion, Manny Pacquiao. Donaire was a child of small stature and was bullied.

Donaire's father was an amateur boxer who competed in the U.S. in the early 1990s. His paternal grandfather was born in Hawaii, and this gave Donaire American citizenship under the principle of jus Sanguinis. In 1993, at the age of eleven, Donaire joined his father in Van Nuys, California. They later lived in San Leandro, California. and San Mateo County, California.

Donaire said that during his childhood he wished for more attention from his parents and, after his brother started boxing, the attention was given to him. This was his reason for entering the sport of boxing at the age of eleven even though he did not enjoy it. His father supported his choice as he felt it would keep Donaire off the streets. During their younger years, Donaire and Glenn would spar. Donaire also watched videos of his hero, Alexis Argüello, and from them he learned to throw a powerful left hook.

While enrolled at the San Lorenzo High School in San Lorenzo, California, both Nonito and Glenn won several regional and district amateur boxing championships.
In his first amateur bout, Nonito beat his opponent with straight punches, all the while thinking that "I'm going to kill him before he kills me." However, Donaire had little confidence until he had five professional knockout victories.

Amateur career 
As a young amateur, Donaire won three U.S. national championships: the National Silver Gloves (1998), National Junior Olympics (1999) and the National USA Tournament (2000). He also won the 1999 International Junior Olympics gold medal. Donaire's amateur record was 68 – 8 with 5 technical knockouts (TKOs).

Professional career 
In 2001, Donaire and his brother became professional boxers. They signed contracts with a promoter, Jackie Kallen. Donaire was paid a monthly salary of $1,500. In 2001, after a controversial decision, Donaire lost his second fight against Rosendo Sanchez. This impassioned him to win his fights which he did until April 2013. After four professional bouts, Donaire and his brother left their contracts with Kallen and returned to Manila and then to San Leandro, where there were fewer distractions.

Early years 
On September 9, 2002, in Guam, Donaire won his first regional title, the vacant WBO Asia Pacific flyweight title. He knocked out Kaichon Sor Vorapin in the second round. On January 20, 2006, Donaire won his second regional title, the NABF super flyweight title, by defeating Kahren Harutyunyan via split decision (SD) on ShoBox. Two judges scored the bout 97–92 for Donaire while the third scored it 95–94 for Harutyunan. On October 7, 2006, Donaire defeated Oscar Andrade, a veteran boxer, by unanimous decision (UD) with the scorecards reading 118–109, 116–112, and 116–112.

Flyweight

Donaire vs. Darchinyan 

On July 7, 2007, Donaire won the IBF and IBO flyweight titles with a one-punch, fifth-round knockout (KO) of the then undefeated Vic Darchinyan. This victory was awarded Ring Magazine's "Knockout of the Year" and "Upset of the Year".

On July 31, 2007, Donaire met Philippine President Gloria Macapagal Arroyo. Donaire said the experience was, "an overwhelming feeling. It was indescribable. The moment I walked up the stairs and she was up there and when I looked it was a moment when I couldn't even look at her face. It was a great honor." Then, on December 1, 2007, Donaire made the first defense of his IBF and IBO titles against Luis Maldonado of Mexico, winning via technical knockout (TKO) in the eighth round. Donaire said, "I guess my validation was today but I didn't feel my best; I felt sluggish. I didn't have my legs. I don't know what the problem was. I couldn't move well so I tried to rely on my upper body movement."

In late June 2008, Donaire severed his association with his promoter, Gary Shaw. Donaire had not been offered the number of fights his contract demanded. Shaw also failed to disclose revenue from fights as demanded by the Muhammad Ali Boxing Reform Act. Days after leaving Gary Shaw Productions, Donaire signed a contract with Top Rank Boxing.

Donaire vs. Mthalane 
On November 2, 2008, Donaire made the second defense of his titles with a sixth-round (1:31) TKO of Moruti Mthalane.<ref>Dela Cruz E. "Donaire Wins in Six Impressive Rounds!" BoxingCapital.com.</ "Donaire passes pre-fight checkup, but has asthma." The Philippine Star August 14, 2009. Accessed March 7, 2012.</ref> Although Donaire's asthma condition was well managed in general, after his illness in the Mthalane fight, Donaire became estranged from his father who did not acknowledge the medical problem.

On April 19, 2009, Donaire faced Raul Martinez, for a third defense of his titles at the Araneta Coliseum in Quezon City, Philippines. Donaire scored a TKO in the fourth round (2:42). For this match, Donaire was trained by the Peñalosa brothers: Gerry, Dodie Boy and Jonathan. After the match, Donaire was recorded in the Ring Magazine pound for pound rankings in seventh position.

Super flyweight 
The International Boxing Federation ordered a rematch between Donaire and the previous challenger, Moruti Mthalane to take place by August 1, 2009. However, Donaire, now  wished to move up to the super flyweight division.

Donaire vs. Concepción 
Donaire was to fight Hugo Fidel Cazares on August 15, 2009, but negotiations failed. Rafael Concepción replaced Cazares as Donaire's opponent for the WBA interim super flyweight title Donaire hired a conditioning coach, Mike Bazzel, to assist Dodie Boy and Jonathan Peñalosa in his training at the Undisputed Boxing Gym, San Carlos. Donaire dedicated his fight against Concepcion to the memory of Corazon "Cory" Aquino and requested Everlast, a boxing equipment company, provide a yellow robe with the inscription "I. M. O. (in memory of) former Pres. Cory Aquino." He captured the title via twelve-round UD. After his win, Donaire was honored in a motorcade in Manila organised by Alfredo Lim, the mayor.

In late 2009, Donaire began training under Robert Garcia.

Donaire vs. Vargas 
On February 13, 2010, Donaire fought Manuel Vargas in the first defense of his WBA interim title. The fight took place at the Las Vegas Hilton in Las Vegas, Nevada. Vargas, a late replacement for Gerson Guerrero, had to move up three weight divisions in order to participate. The bout headlined the card titled "Pinoy Power 3." Donaire won the fight with a third-round (1:33) KO.

After the fight, Donaire planned to move up to the bantamweight division and expressed his wish to fight Vic Darchinyan and Fernando Montiel, but neither bout took place.

Donaire vs. Márquez 

Donaire fought his last bout in the super flyweight division against Hernán Márquez. The fight was on the undercard of the Juan Manuel López and Bernabe Concepcion bout on July 10, 2010, at the Coliseo Jose Miguel Agrelot in San Juan, Puerto Rico. Donaire had challenged Eric Morel who declined. Donaire won the match with a TKO in the eighth round.

Bantamweight 
Following his win against Márquez, Donaire stated his intention to compete in the bantamweight division by challenging unified WBC and WBO champion, Fernando Montiel.

Donaire vs. Sydorenko 
On December 4, 2010, Donaire challenged the former WBA bantamweight champion, Volodymyr Sydorenko for the vacant WBC Continental Americas bantamweight title. Donaire knocked down Sydorenko three times and became the first man to defeat the boxer. The win against Sydorenko gave Donaire the chance to face Montiel.

Donaire vs. Montiel 

On February 19, 2011, Donaire defeated Montiel in the second round to capture the WBC and WBO bantamweight titles. Donaire took a right to the head from Montiel, then immediately countered with a left to the head that knocked his opponent down. Montiel rose to continue before Donaire rushed over to land a left and a right. The referee, Russell Mora, stopped the fight at 2:25 of the second round. He was given a third place in Ring Magazine's "pound for pound" rankings. Juan Manuel Marquez and Sergio Martínez were ahead of him.

On February 28, 2011, resolutions moved by Pia Cayetano and Manuel Lapid were passed by the senate of the Philippines that Donaire be congratulated and commended for being an outstanding Filipino boxer and for bringing honor and pride to the country.

Donaire vs. Narváez 

On October 22, 2011, Donaire made his New York debut, beating the previously undefeated two-division world champion, Omar Narváez, via UD at Madison Square Garden in New York.

Super bantamweight

Donaire vs. Vázquez Jr. 
In 2012, Donaire fought Wilfredo Vázquez Jr. After twelve rounds, Donaire had scores of 117–110 and 117-110. Surprisingly, the third judge scored 115–112 in favour of Vázquez Jr. Donaire landed sixty percent of his power shots and out-landed Vázquez Jr in rounds one to five and seven to twelve and was awarded the WBO super bantamweight title. In the ninth round, Vázquez Jr. was knocked down for the first time in his professional career. Donaire became the second Filipino (after Manny Pacquiao) to win championships in four weight divisions.

Donaire vs. Mathebula 
On July 7, 2012, Donaire fought in a unification bout against IBF super bantamweight champion Jeffrey Mathebula. Donaire's progress of 28–1 with 18 knockouts was matched with Mathebula's of 26–3 with two draws and 14 knockouts. It was possible the two boxers' super bantamweight world titles would be unified. The bout was televised live on HBO Boxing After Dark from the Home Depot centre in Carson, California. Donaire defeated Mathebula by UD, knocking him down in round four and breaking his jaw in two places.

Donaire vs. Nishioka 
On October 13, 2012, in Carson, California, Donaire fought Toshiaki Nishioka who had been ranked first in his division by Ring magazine. Donaire officially relinquished the IBF super bantamweight title hours before the fight by declining to participate in the IBF's mandated weight check. When, by the ninth round, Nishioka had been knocked down twice, his cornerman asked the referee to end the fight, handing Donaire a TKO victory to retain his WBO title and capture the vacant Ring magazine super bantamweight title. The purse from this bout and his contract with HBO earned Donaire 800,000 dollars.

Donaire vs. Arce 
On December 15, 2012, in Houston, Texas, Donaire retained his titles against Jorge Arce with a third-round (2:59) KO. Donaire had already knocked down Arce in the second and third rounds.

Donaire vs. Rigondeaux 

On April 13, 2013, Donaire fought WBA (Super) champion Guillermo Rigondeaux at Radio City Music Hall in New York. Donaire knocked Rigondeaux down once in the tenth round en route to a UD defeat, losing his WBO and Ring titles and ending his twelve year winning streak.

Featherweight

Donaire vs. Darchinyan II 
In November 2013, Donaire fought Vic Darchinyan in non-title fight that was a rematch of their 2007 fight. The bout was on the undercard of a Mikey Garcia vs. Román Martínez. Donaire started strong, but Darchinyan mounted a comeback in the middle rounds to take the lead on two of the official scorecards. However, in the ninth round, Donaire was able to drop Darchinyan with a left hook. Although he was able to beat the count, Darchinyan wasn't able to intelligently defend himself, prompting the referee to stop the fight (2:06).

Donaire vs. Vetyeka 
On May 31, 2014, Donaire fought Simpiwe Vetyeka for the WBA (Super) featherweight title at The Venetian Macao Hotel & Resort's CotaiArena in Macau. Donaire knocked down Vetyeka in the fourth round after landing his signature left hook. The fight was stopped seconds after the bell for the fifth round due to a cut on Donaire's left eye from an accidental head butt. Donaire won the bout via unanimous technical decision (TD).

Donaire vs. Walters 
On October 18, 2014, Donaire made the first defense of his WBA (Super) title against undefeated WBA (Regular) champion Nicholas Walters. The fight took place in Carson, California, on the undercard of the Gennady Golovkin vs. Marco Antonio Rubio bout. Donaire rocked Walters heavily early on, but other than that had little success and was dropped twice before the referee stopped the fight. It was the first knockout loss of Donaire's career.

Return to super bantamweight 
On March 28, 2015, Donaire returned to the super bantamweight division and defeated William Prado in two rounds to secure the vacant NABF super bantamweight title at the Araneta Coliseum in the Philippines. A flurried attack had Prado dazed at the end of the first round. Donaire continued his attack at the beginning of the second round and the fight was stopped. On July 18, 2015, Donaire also defeated Anthony Settoul in two rounds via stoppage at The Venetian Macao in Macau.

Donaire vs. Juarez 
On December 11, 2015, Donaire reclaimed the vacant WBO super bantamweight title, defeating Cesar Juarez by UD. The fight was controlled by Donaire early on, dropping the Mexican brawler twice, but Juarez showed good punch resistance to keep going. Donaire began to slow down due to fatigue and an ankle injury, as Juarez picked up the pressure. The latter rounds were much closer as the fight turned into a slugfest and a 'fight of the year' candidate, it ended with both fighters exhausted and swinging wildly at the final bell. Donaire defended the WBO title successfully against Zsolt Bedak via third-round TKO in Cebu City, Philippines on April 23, 2016.

Donaire vs. Magdaleno 
Donaire lost to Jessie Magdaleno as the co-main event on Manny Pacquiao vs. Jessie Vargas PPV bout on November 5, 2016. This marked the first time Donaire and Pacquiao, the two biggest boxing stars to come out of the Philippines, have ever shared the same card.

Return to featherweight 
On March 8, 2017, Top Rank and Donaire agreed to end their partnership after an eight-year run with only about a month remaining in the contract. On July 25, 2017, Donaire signed with Richard Schaefer's Ringstar Sports.

On September 23, 2017, Donaire returned to featherweight and defeated Ruben Garcia Hernandez via UD to win the vacant WBC Silver featherweight title at the Alamodome in San Antonio, Texas.

Donaire vs. Frampton 
In December 2017, Donaire came up as a potential opponent for Carl Frampton after the announcement from promoter Frank Warren. Negotiations began on December 19, 2017, between Donaire's promoter, Ringstar Sports, and Warren. On December 21, 2017, the fight was officially announced for April 21, 2018, at the SSE Arena, Belfast, Northern Ireland by Warren via the BoxNation Facebook page.

Frampton put on a defensive performance and beat Donaire via UD, becoming the WBO interim featherweight champion. All three judges scored the fight 117–111 for Frampton. Frampton fought well to get a strong lead and after round six started to fight on the backfoot. In the later rounds, Donaire had more success, hurting Frampton on a number of occasions, landing a hard left hook in round eleven. Donaire was cut over his right after an accidental clash of heads in round seven, with the referee failing to call a time-out. After the fight, Frampton said on live television, "I didn't have to get involved in a fight there, as you saw in the last round Nonito Donaire is a dangerous motherfucker. I survived the round and stuck to my game plan. The only thing on my mind is Windsor Park and I can't wait to get there." According to CompuBox Stats, Frampton landed 164 of 557 punches thrown (29.4%) and Donaire landed 104 of his 447 thrown (23.3%).

Return to bantamweight

World Boxing Super Series 

On May 9, 2018, at a news conference in London, the World Boxing Super Series (WBSS) announced that season two would include the bantamweights.

Donaire vs. Burnett 
The draft gala for the WBSS took place in Moscow on July 20, 2018. Donaire was chosen by top-seeded Ryan Burnett as his opponent in the quarter finals. On September 7, 2018, the WBSS announced a doubleheader would take place at The SSE Hydro in Glasgow on November 3, 2018. The card would see Burnett vs. Donaire as well as the quarter final fight from the super-lightweight tournament which would see Josh Taylor go up against Ryan Martin.

Burnett looked to have taken the first two rounds as Donaire reset on the third and began to box smarter. During the third round, Burnett received a counter left-hook to the body and felt the after effects. During the fourth round, Burnett reached for his lower back after throwing a combination of punches, an exchange which was counted as a knock down for Donaire. Burnett survived the round but failed to answer the bell for round five. Donaire showed respect to Burnett by going straight to Burnett's corner to give him some words of encouragement instead of celebrating. Donaire captured the WBA (Super) bantamweight title and moved on to the semifinals of the WBSS to face WBO champion Zolani Tete.

Donaire vs. Young 
On April 27, 2019, Nonito Donaire faced #5-ranked WBA contender Stephon Young, a last-minute replacement for Tete, who had to withdraw from the bout out due to a shoulder injury. The fight was held at the Cajundome in Lafayette, Louisiana, and the winner was set to face either WBA (Regular) bantamweight champion Naoya Inoue or IBF bantamweight champion Emmanuel Rodríguez.

Donaire made use of his jab to outbox Young in the succeeding rounds and put a final stamp in the sixth round with a counter-left hook that landed flush on Young's jaw, immediately knocking him out.

Donaire vs. Inoue 
On November 8, 2019, Donaire faced Naoya Inoue for the WBSS final in Japan. Donaire lost his title and the bout by UD. During the second round, Donaire opened a cut above Inoue's right eye after landing a left hook. It was the first time Inoue suffered a cut in his career. In the eleventh round, Donaire was knocked down after absorbing a body shot. The bout was scored 117–109, 116–111, and 114-113 in favor of Inoue. After the fight, Donaire and Inoue showed each other mutual respect, with Inoue lauding Donaire as "a true champion." The fight was later voted the Ring magazine Fight of the Year.

Cancelled fight with Rodríguez 
Donaire was scheduled to face Emmanuel Rodríguez for the WBC bantamweight title on December 19, 2020, at the Mohegan Sun Arena in Montville, Connecticut. On December 10 it was reported that Donaire tested positive for COVID-19, forcing him to withdraw from the bout. He was originally scheduled to face Nordine Oubaali, who was replaced by Rodríguez after Oubaali also tested positive for COVID-19. Reymart Gaballo, who was also scheduled to fight on the same day against Jose Velasquez of Chile, substituted for Donaire and will fight Rodríguez for the WBC interim title.

Donaire vs. Oubaali 
On May 29, 2021, Donaire faced Nordine Oubaali for the WBC bantamweight title at the Dignity Health Sports Park in Carson, California. Donaire scored a knockdown twice in the third round before finishing the bout in the fourth round with a hook-straight-uppercut combination. The referee waived off the count awarding Donaire with the win and making him the oldest fighter to win a world championship in the bantamweight division at the age of 38.

Cancelled fight with John Riel Casimero 
On June 19, 2021, it was announced that Donaire would replace Guillermo Rigondeaux to face WBO bantamweight champion John Riel Casimero on August 14 in a unification bout. However, on June 30, Donaire announced that he would be pulling out of the fight, citing concerns over VADA testing.

Donaire vs. Inoue II 
After a successful first title defense in which he knocked out Reymart Gaballo, Donaire lost his WBC bantamweight title by knockout in the second round of a unification bout with WBA and IBF bantamweight champion Naoya Inoue in a rematch on June 7, 2022. The bout was held at the Super Arena in Saitama, Japan, and was broadcast on ESPN+. He was knocked out in the second round, after being knocked down twice.

Donaire vs. Santiago 
Soon after Naoya Inoue moved up in weight and vacated his bantamweight titles, it was announced that the WBC has approved Donaire vs Alexandro Santiago to be for the vacant WBC bantamweight title. Donaire would have a shot at being world champion again at age 40.

Personal life 
On August 8, 2008, Donaire married Rachel Marcial, a Filipino-American USA national collegiate and military Taekwondo champion in a private ceremony at Carmel, California followed by a church service in the Philippines on November 11, 2011. They have two sons named Jarel Michael and Jarel Logan.

Donaire's wife is a member of his team and her father is his chief of security. On July 4, 2013, Donaire's pregnant wife was injured while saving a drowning child. She recovered and her then-unborn second child, Logan, was unharmed.

Professional boxing record

Titles in boxing

Professional 
Major world titles:
IBF flyweight champion (112 lbs)
WBC bantamweight champion (118 lbs) (2x)
WBO bantamweight champion (118 lbs)
WBA (Super) bantamweight champion (118 lbs)
WBO super bantamweight champion (122 lbs) (2×)
IBF super bantamweight champion (122 lbs)
WBA (Undisputed) featherweight champion (126 lbs)

Interim titles:
WBA interim super flyweight champion (115 lbs)

Minor world titles:
IBO flyweight champion (112 lbs)

The Ring magazine titles:
The Ring super bantamweight champion (122 lbs)

Regional titles:
WBO Asia Pacific flyweight champion (112 lbs)
NABF super flyweight champion (115 lbs)
WBC Continental Americas bantamweight champion (118 lbs)
NABF super bantamweight champion (122 lbs)
WBC Silver featherweight champion (126 lbs)

Honorary titles:
2013 Flash Elorde Memorial champion
WBC Diamond super bantamweight champion
WBC Diamond bantamweight champion

Amateur 
National titles:
1998 National Silver Gloves champion
1999 National Jr. Olympics champion
2000 National USA Tournament champion

International titles:
1999 International Jr. Olympics champion

Recognitions 
 2007, 2011 and 2012 Philippine Sportswriters Association (PSA) Sportsman of the Year
 2007 The Ring Knockout of the Year (in Round 5 against Vic Darchinyan)
 2007 The Ring Upset of the Year (KO 5 against Vic Darchinyan)
 2007 World Boxing Hall of Fame, Most Outstanding Boxer of the Year
 2009, 2010 & 2011 Gabriel "Flash" Elorde Memorial Boxer of the Year
 2009 Eastwood City Walk of Fame Awardee
 2011 The Ring Knockout of the Year (in Round 2 against Fernando Montiel)
 2011 Sports Illustrated Knockout of the Year (in Round 2 against Fernando Montiel)
 2011 ESPN Knockout of the Year (in Round 2 against Fernando Montiel)
 2012 Boxing Writers Association of America Fighter of the Year.
 2012 ESPN Fighter of the Year.
 2012 The Ring Fighter of the Year.
 2012 Sports Illustrated Fighter of the Year.
 2012 Yahoo! Sports Fighter of the Year.

In popular culture 
Donaire has appeared on television as a guest and has appeared on Celebrity Duets in third-season episodes on GMA. Donaire is also featured in the video games Fight Night Round 4 and Fight Night Champion.

Filmography

See also 

List of Filipino boxing world champions
List of WBA world champions
List of WBC world champions
List of IBF world champions
List of WBO world champions
List of IBO world champions
List of The Ring world champions
List of flyweight boxing champions
List of bantamweight boxing champions
List of super bantamweight boxing champions
List of featherweight boxing champions
List of boxing quadruple champions
The Ring pound for pound

References

Video references

External links 

1982 births
Living people
Boxers from California
Filipino male boxers
Filipino emigrants to the United States
People from Bohol
Sportspeople from General Santos
Boxers from South Cotabato
Recipients of the Order of Lakandula
Participants in Philippine reality television series
Winners of the United States Championship for amateur boxers
International Boxing Federation champions
World Boxing Council champions
World Boxing Association champions
World Boxing Organization champions
World flyweight boxing champions
World bantamweight boxing champions
World super-bantamweight boxing champions
World featherweight boxing champions
American male boxers
The Ring (magazine) champions
Super-flyweight boxers
People with acquired American citizenship